The Uruguay national under-18 and under-19 basketball team is a national basketball team of Uruguay, administered by the Federación Uruguaya de Básquetbol - "FUBB".

It represents the country in international under-18 and under-19 (under age 18 and under age 19) basketball competitions.

See also
Uruguay national basketball team
Uruguay national under-17 basketball team

References

External links
Uruguay Basketball Records at FIBA Archive

U-19
Men's national under-19 basketball teams